René Stadler (born 19 May 1940) is a Swiss bobsledder who competed in the early 1970s. He won three medals in the four-man event at the FIBT World Championships with two golds (1971, 1973) and one bronze (1970). He also competed at the 1968 Winter Olympics.

References

External links
Bobsleigh four-man world championship medalists since 1930

Living people
Swiss male bobsledders
1940 births
Olympic bobsledders of Switzerland
Bobsledders at the 1968 Winter Olympics
20th-century Swiss people